Maria Sharapova was the two-time defending champion, but decided not to participate that year.

Second-seeded Nicole Vaidišová was leading 7–6(7–4), 3–2 in the final against third-seeded Tatiana Golovin, when Golovin retired due to an achilles tendon injury, giving Vaidišová the title. This remains one of the youngest finals in WTA history.

Seeds

Draw

Finals

Top half

Bottom half

References

External links
 http://itftennis.com/procircuit/tournaments/women's-tournament/info.aspx?tournamentid=1100012723

2005 Japan Open Tennis Championships